Xanthosomnium is a monotypic genus of wasps belonging to the family Ichneumonidae. The only species is Xanthosomnium froesei.

The species is found in Central America.

References

Ichneumonidae
Ichneumonidae genera
Monotypic Hymenoptera genera